The Santa Fe Railway Water Tank, or Sedalia Water Tank, on the railway through Sedalia, Colorado in Douglas County, Colorado, is a historic object listed on the National Register of Historic Places.

Per its NRHP nomination, it was installed by the Denver and Santa Fe Railway Company, a subsidiary of the Atchison, Topeka and Santa Fe Railway (AT&SF), an early railroad which built track through the area in 1887. It provided water for coal-powered steam locomotives from 1906 until 1950 when its "stand pipe" was removed, after water was no longer needed (when diesel locomotives had replaced steam ones).

It was described in its NRHP nomination as follows:

It was deemed significant "for its association with the operation of the Atchison, Topeka and Santa Fe Railway (AT&SF), an early railroad that constructed its track through the area in  1887. The tank provided water for the coal-fired steam locomotives that ran the line. At the end of WW II,  diesel engines began replacing steam locomotives, and the need for large water tanks at frequent intervals along the rails diminished. Most steam locomotives were retired by the 1950s. It was later deeded to the Sedalia Water and Sanitation District for the community’s water supply. The period of significance began with the construction of the tank in  1906 and ended in 1950 when the stand pipe was removed. The steel tank also meets the registration requirements under criterion C for it  represents a distinctive design and construction method. In  the 19th  and early 20th  centuries, water stations usually consisted of elevated wooden water tanks. Steel tanks began to replace wood on some railroads after the turn of the century. The steel tank at Sedalia is an early example of the evolving technology, and it  is  believed to be one of the last surviving steel water tanks in the state."

It is closer to U.S. 85 and directly visible from that highway. It is also visible from Colorado State Highway 67, at least from its crossing of the rail tracks.

See also
Sedalia Historic Fire House Museum
National Register of Historic Places listings in Douglas County, Colorado

References

National Register of Historic Places in Douglas County, Colorado
Water tanks on the National Register of Historic Places
Water towers on the National Register of Historic Places in Colorado
Railway buildings and structures on the National Register of Historic Places in Colorado
Buildings and structures completed in 1906